San Francisco La Unión is a municipality in the Quetzaltenango department of Guatemala, known for its large market. It has five cantones Centro, Pala, Paxan, Xeaj, Chuistancia and Tzanjuyup and also they celebrate the 4 de Octubre in honor to San Francisco de ASIS where, they have parade from all the schools that they are in.

San Francisco La Union celebrates its yearly dance from January 15 until January 18.  This town was founded in 1883.  All La Union descendants are from San Francisco El Alto Totonicapan Place that Belong to Other Departament "State" Of Guatemala.

Municipalities of the Quetzaltenango Department